Ingrid Sternhoff (born 25 February 1977) is a former Norwegian football goalkeeper and World Champion. She played on the Norwegian team that won the 1995 FIFA Women's World Cup in Sweden. She also played on the Norwegian team that won the bronze medal for Women's Football at the 1996 Summer Olympics. Her clubs include Klepp IL.

Sternhoff went to college in America, attending the University of Hartford. While at the University of Hartford she played for the university soccer team.

References

External links

1977 births
Living people
Women's association football goalkeepers
Norwegian women's footballers
Hartford Hawks women's soccer players
Olympic medalists in football
Norway women's international footballers
1995 FIFA Women's World Cup players
Footballers at the 1996 Summer Olympics
Olympic footballers of Norway
Olympic bronze medalists for Norway
FIFA Women's World Cup-winning players
Toppserien players
Klepp IL players
Kolbotn Fotball players
Medalists at the 1996 Summer Olympics